Huliyar  is a town in the southern state of Karnataka, India. It is located in the Chiknayakanhalli taluk of Tumakuru district in Karnataka. It is located at a distance of 42 kms from its sub-divisional headquarters, Tiptur. It is known for Industrial Area, Education, and availability of Automobile stores syed Noor Noori.

Demographics
As of 2011 India census, Huliyar had a population of 14,304	 with 7,084 males and 7,220 females.
huliyar is a main town of tumkur district and is proposed to be a taluk. Due to some administrative issues, it still remains as hobli/census town. It has all taluk level facilities with many govt offices and banks.
It is well connected to Tiptur, Turuvekere, Chikkanayakanahalli, Hosadurga, Sira and Hiriyuru.

See also
 Tumkur
 Districts of Karnataka
Hagalavadi
Kenkere
Bukkapatna.
Gubbi.
Tumkur.
Hosdurga.
Davanagere.
Ganadhal.

References

External links
 http://Tumkur.nic.in/

Villages in Tumkur district